Agaricus impudicus, also known as the tufted wood mushroom, is a mushroom of Agaricus, a genus with many edible species.

Description
As with all Agaricus species, gills are free, colour progresses with age from pale-pink to a chocolate color, and spores are dark brown. The stipe has a clear annulus (ring).

Cap 4–15 cm wide, and appears brownish due to numerous brownish scales on a white background. The stipe is white, 6–12 cm tall and 0.8–2 cm thick, cylindrical and wider towards the bottom, or ending in a bulb.

It is distinguished from similar forest-growing Agaricus mushrooms in that it does not bruise yellowish or reddish when cut, except for the attachment of stalk and cap which may turn slightly pink, and the widening stipe. Taste is mild and earthy, and the mushroom is sometimes regarded as edible; however, other authors treat it as inedible in practice if not in theory because it has a nauseating smell resembling rotten radish, which persists during cooking.

Habitat
Known to occur in Western and Southern Europe and New Zealand, this uncommon mushroom is found in deciduous or coniferous forest in autumn.

Taxonomy
This species is known under a number of synonyms, all these refer to the same species:

Agaricus brunnoleus (J. Lange) Pilát
Agaricus koelerionensis (Bon) Bon 1980
Agaricus reae Bon 1981
Agaricus variegans F.H. Møller 1952
Agaricus variegatus (F.H. Møller) Pil�t 1951
Psalliota impudica Rea 1932
Psalliota variegata F.H. Møller 1950
Psalliota variegata var. koelerionis Bon 1972

See also
List of Agaricus species

External links
 "Danske storsvampe.  Basidiesvampe" [a key to Danish basidiomycetes] J.H. Petersen and J. Vesterholt eds. Gyldendal. Viborg, Denmark, 1990.  
 Agaricus impudicus entry at Global Biodiversity Information Facility.

References 

impudicus
Fungi described in 1932
Fungi of Europe
Fungi of New Zealand